Roy A. Batchelor (born 23 March 1947) is Professor Emeritus in Political Economy and Statistics in Bayes Business School (formerly Cass), City, University of London.

Educated at Allan Glen's School and Glasgow University, Roy worked as a government scientist and economist; then at the UK National Institute of Economic and Social Research. He joined City University in 1977, and has since been active there in research, teaching and academic administration, this including spells as Head of Banking and Finance Department, Director of the Bayes (formerly Cass) Executive MBA programme in Dubai, and of the Executive MBA in London.

Professor Batchelor’s research has focussed on economic and financial market forecasting, and the interpretation and use of consumer and business survey data. He has published widely in these fields, often in the International Journal of Forecasting, and its sister practitioner journal, Foresight. In 2008 Professor Batchelor was elected Honorary Fellow of the International Institute of Forecasters, and he has since served as an elected Director of the IIF. 

In parallel with his academic work, Professor Batchelor has been active in professional training and consultancy with business and governmental organisations around the world. He has held many visiting academic appointments, and is a Fellow and Research Professor at the ifo Institute for Economic Research in Munich.

Batchelor supervised the PhD thesis of Richard Ramyar, a former director of the United Kingdom Society of Technical Analysts. This claimed to debunk Fibonacci ratio technical analysis in the US equity market. This work was described in multiple business news outlets, and he has also received press coverage for his other work on finance.

References

External links 
 City University biography
 Linkedin
 Early Chess and Chess Problems

1947 births
Living people
English economists
Academics of City, University of London
Academics of Bayes Business School